Shuangcheng District is one of nine districts of the prefecture-level city of Harbin, the capital of Heilongjiang Province, Northeast China, covering part of the southwestern suburbs. The district was approved to establish from the former Shuangcheng City by the Chinese State Council on May 2, 2014. Formerly a county-level city until 15 May 2014. The westernmost county-level division of Harbin City, it borders Daoli District to the north, Nangang and Pingfang Districts to the northeast, Acheng District to the east, and Wuchang to the southeast, as well as the Jilin prefecture-level divisions of Changchun to the south and Songyuan to the southwest.

Administrative divisions 
Shuangcheng District is divided into 10 subdistricts, 8 towns, 1 ethnic town, 4 townships and 4 ethnic townships. 
10 subdistricts
 Wujia, Xinxing, Lanleng, Zhoujia, Gongzheng, Chengxu, Cheng'en, Yongzhi, Yonghe, Xingfu
8 towns
 Handian, Dancheng, Dongguan, Xingshan, Xiguan, Lianxing, Yongsheng, Shengfeng
1 ethnic town
 Nongfeng Manchu and Xibe
4 townships
 Jincheng, Linjiang, Shuiquan, Wanlong
4 ethnic townships
 Qingling Manchu, Lequn Manchu, Xiqin Manchu, Tongxin Manchu

Climate

References

External links 

Cities in Heilongjiang
Districts of Harbin